Elfriede Spiegelhauer-Uhlig (3 September 1934 – 21 November 2013) was a German cross-country skier. She competed at the 1956 Winter Olympics and the 1964 Winter Olympics.

Cross-country skiing results

Olympic Games

World Championships

References

External links
 

1934 births
2013 deaths
German female cross-country skiers
Olympic cross-country skiers of the United Team of Germany
Cross-country skiers at the 1956 Winter Olympics
Cross-country skiers at the 1964 Winter Olympics
Sportspeople from Saxony